Chad Blackman is a Barbadian politician and diplomat. He is the Senior Advisor to the Director-General of the International Labour Organization, H.E Gilbert Houngbo, and served as Barbados' Ambassador and Permanent Representative to the United Nations and Geneva , Vienna, and Rome, and former Ambassador to Switzerland, Austria, Serbia and Hungary. As Ambassador, he was President of the G77 and China Geneva Chapter; Co-ordinator of the Group of Small Island Developing States; Co-ordinator of the Group of Latin-America and Caribbean Countries GRULAC, and is a Global Board Member of the United Nations International Gender Champions. Blackman is also an international trade law specialist. He has served as the youth development consultant with the Commonwealth Secretariat in London. He served as the chair for the Trade and Development, and Trade and Environment Committees in the World Trade Organization (WTO). Blackman is also the first Ambassador of Barbados to Serbia. He also Chaired the SIDS Group in the United Nations Conference on Trade and Development.

He obtained his bachelor's of law degree and masters in International Trade Law at the University of Essex, United Kingdom.

References 

Living people
Barbadian politicians
Barbadian diplomats
Alumni of the University of Essex
Permanent Representatives of Barbados to the United Nations
Year of birth missing (living people)
Family